Vernon Nagel (6 March 1905 – 27 April 1974) was an Australian cricketer. He played four first-class cricket matches for Victoria between 1932 and 1936.

See also
 List of Victoria first-class cricketers

References

External links
 

1905 births
1974 deaths
Australian cricketers
Victoria cricketers
Sportspeople from Bendigo
Twin sportspeople
Australian twins
Cricketers from Victoria (Australia)